Meg Harris,  (born 7 March 2002) is an Australian swimmer. She is a world record holder in the 4×100 metre freestyle relay. She competed in the 2020 Summer Olympics, where she won a gold medal in the 4×100 metre freestyle relay and a bronze medal in the 4×200 metre freestyle relay. She also won an individual gold medal at the 2017 Bahamas Commonwealth Youth Games in the 50 freestyle. She is also the co-founder of the clothing brand Dally&Co Label.

Background
Harris attended Mt St Michael's College in Ashgrove, Brisbane.

Career

2020 Olympics
During the 2020 Summer Olympics in Tokyo, Harris swam the second leg for the gold medal-winning Australian Women's 4 × 100 metre freestyle relay team in the final. The Australian women broke the world record with a time of 3:29.69. Harris's split was 53.09. She also swam the heats of the 4 × 200 metre freestyle relay with a split of 1:57.01. Harris did not swim in the final where the Australians finished third, but received a bronze medal for swimming in the heats of the relay.

After the Olympics Harris moved from Brisbane, where she had been coached by Dean Boxall, to Adelaide, where she came under the tutelage of noted sprint coach Peter Bishop.

2022
In January 2022, Harris broke her arm and announced the injury on Instagram. Harris later announced the injury was not training related and she attained the broken arm when she accidentally ran a scooter into a rock.

In the 2022 Australia Day Honours, Harris was awarded a Medal of the Order of Australia.

World records

Long course metres

 split 53.09 (2nd leg); with Bronte Campbell (1st leg), Emma McKeon (3rd leg), Cate Campbell (4th leg)

Short course metres

 split 52.00 (3rd leg); with Mollie O'Callaghan (1st leg), Madison Wilson (2nd leg), Emma McKeon (4th leg)

See also
 List of Olympic medalists in swimming (women)
 World record progression 4 × 100 metres freestyle relay

References

External links
 
 
 
 
 

2002 births
Living people
Swimmers at the 2020 Summer Olympics
Medalists at the 2020 Summer Olympics
Olympic gold medalists for Australia
Olympic gold medalists in swimming
Recipients of the Medal of the Order of Australia
Australian female freestyle swimmers
Olympic swimmers of Australia
World record holders in swimming
Sportspeople from Albury
Sportswomen from New South Wales
World Aquatics Championships medalists in swimming
Medalists at the FINA World Swimming Championships (25 m)
Swimmers at the 2022 Commonwealth Games
Commonwealth Games medallists in swimming
Commonwealth Games gold medallists for Australia
Commonwealth Games silver medallists for Australia
21st-century Australian women
Medallists at the 2022 Commonwealth Games